"Rock'n'Roll-Übermensch" (also spelled "Rock'n'Roll Übermensch") (Rock'n'roll Superman) is a song by the German rock band Die Ärzte. It is the 18th track and the fourth single from their 2000 album Runter mit den Spendierhosen, Unsichtbarer!.

Music video 
The band is performing in a department store. Throughout the song, Bela slowly grows larger and larger until he becomes too large for the stage and eventually bursts through the store's ceiling. The video is shot in a cinema verite style, directed by Philipp Stölzl and Johannes Grebert.

Track listing 
 "Rock'n'Roll-Übermensch (Radio Mix)" (Gonzalez, Felsenheimer) - 3:54
 "Rock'n'Roll-Übermensch (Jauche's Pina Colada Mix)" (Gonzalez, Felsenheimer) - 5:36
 "Rock'n'Roll-Übermensch (Circuit Breaker Mix)" (Gonzalez, Felsenheimer) - 5:01
 "Rock'n'Roll-Übermensch (Lexy & K-Paul's L&P Mix)" (Gonzalez, Felsenheimer) - 5:13
 "Rock'n'Roll-Übermensch (Al-Haca Megamensch Dub)" (Gonzalez, Felsenheimer) - 4:15
 "Rock'n'Roll-Übermensch (Teddy Uranus Mix)" (Gonzalez, Felsenheimer) - 5:07
 "Rock'n'Roll-Übermensch (Star & Emerson Three Bad Kiddaz Mix)" (Gonzalez, Felsenheimer) - 4:57
 "Rock'n'Roll-Übermensch (Blank & Jones Remix)" (Gonzalez, Felsenheimer) - 6:50
 "Rock'n'Roll-Übermensch (Video)" (Gonzalez, Felsenheimer) - 3:55

Personnel
Bela B. - vocals
Farin Urlaub - bass
Rodrigo González - synthesizer

Charts

2001 singles
Die Ärzte songs
Songs written by Bela B.
2000 songs